Chikila is a genus of amphibian in the order Gymnophiona (caecilians). It is the only genus within the family Chikilidae. All members of the genus are known from northeast India and Bangladesh.

Species
There are four recognized species:

References

Chikilidae
Amphibian genera
Taxa named by Sathyabhama Das Biju
Taxa named by David J. Gower
Taxa named by Rachunliu G Kamei